Lectionary 121, designated by siglum ℓ 121 (in the Gregory-Aland numbering) is a Greek manuscript of the New Testament, on parchment leaves. Palaeographically it has been assigned to the 11th or 12th century.

Description 

The codex contains lessons from the Gospels of John, Matthew, Luke lectionary (Evangelistarium) with some lacunae, on 419 parchment leaves. The text is written in Greek minuscule letters, in one column per page, 22 lines per page. Some material was supplied by a later hand.
It is a very splendid manuscript.

History 

The manuscript was added to the list of New Testament manuscripts by Scholz.

The manuscript is not cited in the critical editions of the Greek New Testament (UBS3).

Currently the codex is located in the Vatican Library (Vat. gr. 1157) in Rome.

See also 

 List of New Testament lectionaries
 Biblical manuscript
 Textual criticism

Notes and references 

Greek New Testament lectionaries
11th-century biblical manuscripts
Manuscripts of the Vatican Library